Coleophora orenburgella is a moth of the family Coleophoridae. It is found in the southern Ural Mountains and the Altai Mountains in Russia.

Adults have been recorded from May to mid-June.

Etymology
The species name refers to the Orenburg district, where the majority of the type specimens were collected.

References

orenburgella
Moths described in 2007
Moths of Asia
Moths of Europe